George Trevare was an Australian Jazz trombonist, orchestral arranger and conductor. He wrote a number of his own compositions. Possibly well known for producing live radio dance band performances (escaping trade union bans on recording, due to the perceived threat to band members livelihood).  Trevare also worked in a nationalist era, when he recorded Australian versions of popular content from overseas, to comply with domestic radio broadcasting quotas of local content and introducing local content in a style emulating popular imports 

George worked with a number of famous people. In 1945, his band included Wally Norman (trumpet), George Trevare (trombone), Rolph Pommer (saxophone), Pat Lynch (piano), Morgan McGree (guitar), Horrie Bissell (bass), Al Vincer (drums, vibraphone) and a young Don Burrows playing clarinet.

Singer Lawrence Brooks on one of the Trevare recordings, is the father of Pulitzer Prize winning author, Geraldine Brooks.

In the 1950s and 60s he produced two TV music shows, The Magic of Music (1961) and Look Who's Dropped In, a four part series about jazz (1957).

Works
1943 Out of The Blue Gums - original composition by Trevare
1943 'Don't Sweetheart Me' with vocals by Joan Blake
1943 Der Fuhrer's Face 
1944 Under The Trees with vocals by Lawrence Brooks
1944 No Love No Nothin’ 
1944 Let's Have One For The Road
1944 Blue Velvet with vocals by Johnny Fitzgerald
1945 arr. One of these days by Joe Slater
1945 arr. The Silver in my Mother's Hair by Vince Courtney
1945 The man from the snowy river : a modern fantasy
1945 Waltzing Matilda with radio 2GB dance orchestra
1947 arr. of songs by Letty Katts and Eric Aitken
1947 Back to Croajingalong arr. music Dunlop, Pat (composer) and Lind, Alice (lyricist) 
1945 arr. 'Curl The Moe Uncle Joe' by Jack Lumsdaine
1945 arr. "Am I?" by Jack Lumsdaine
1952 “I’m Looking Over A Four Leaf Clover”.
1956  Innamorate
1956 The Rock And Roll Waltz
1956 Always Take A Girl Named Daisy
1956 A Bushel And A Peck

References

Date of birth missing
Date of death missing
Australian jazz trombonists